George Frederick Baird (September 5, 1851 – April 29, 1899) was a Canadian politician and lawyer, having studied in the firm of Charles Nelson Skinner.

Baird was born in Wickham, New Brunswick. After studying law he entered the shipping business, and was the leading force in establishing steamship service between Saint John and the Caribbean. He also ran steamship lines on the St. John River. He was elected to the House of Commons of Canada in 1887 to represent the riding of Queen's. He was re-elected in a by-election in 1888, defeated in 1891, and then re-elected in another by-election in 1892. Previous to his federal political career, he was an alderman in Saint John, New Brunswick for two years.

His former home at 269-271 Germain Street in Saint John has been declared an historic site.

Electoral record 

By-election: On Mr. Baird's resignation because his election was contested, 24 November 1887

N.B. The Canadian Directory of Parliament states that George Frederick Baird was declared duly elected by a court decision.

By-election: On Mr. King being declared not duly elected, 25 February 1892, George Frederick Baird was declared elected by a court decision.

See also
 List of federal by-elections in Canada

References

External links 
 

1851 births
1899 deaths
Conservative Party of Canada (1867–1942) MPs
Members of the House of Commons of Canada from New Brunswick